Baftan may refer to:
 Baftan, East Azerbaijan
 Baftan, Sistan and Baluchestan